
Alan D. White is a University of Toronto finance professor, a specialist in financial engineering, best known for the Hull-White interest rate model and associated numerical procedures, authored with John Hull.

He is the Peter L. Mitchelson/SIT Investment Associates Foundation Chair in Investment Strategy and Professor of Finance at the Rotman School of Management.  He is the associate editor of Journal of Financial and Quantitative Analysis and the Journal of Derivatives. Previously, he was assistant professor at York University. His highest cited paper is The pricing of options on assets with stochastic volatilities at 4900 citations, according to Google Scholar.

His research is in the areas of executive stock options, the rating of structured finance products and in best practice risk management approaches. With John Hull, he has made "seminal contributions" to the literature on stochastic volatility models, and credit derivative models.  He is the co-author of Hull-White On Derivatives.
He holds a PhD Finance (University of Toronto 1983), MBA (McMaster University) and BEng (McGill University).

Selected publications

Papers
Corporate Governance and Dual Class Equity; with Chris Robinson and John Rumsey; Canadian Journal of Administrative Sciences; forthcoming
Using Hull-White Interest Rate Trees; with John Hull; Journal of Derivatives; Issue: Vol.3; 1996; Pages: pp. 26–36
A Note on the Models of Hull and White for Pricing Options on the Term Structure: Response; with John Hull; Journal of Fixed Income; Issue: Vol.5; 1995; Pages: pp. 97–102
The Impact of Default Risk on the Prices of Options and other Derivative Securities; Journal of Banking and Finance; Issue: June; 1995; Pages: pp. 299–322

Books
Hull-White on Derivatives with John Hull; London: Risk Publications; 1996

References

University of Toronto alumni
Year of birth missing (living people)
Living people
Financial economists
Academic staff of the University of Toronto
McGill University Faculty of Education alumni
McMaster University alumni
Canadian economists